A summary execution is an execution in which a person is accused of a crime and immediately killed without the benefit of a full and fair trial. Executions as the result of summary justice (such as a drumhead court-martial) are sometimes included, but the term generally refers to capture, accusation, and execution all conducted within a very short period of time, and without any trial. Under international law, refusal to accept lawful surrender in combat and instead killing the person surrendering is also categorized as a summary execution (as well as murder).

Summary executions have been practiced by police, military, and paramilitary organizations and are frequently associated with guerrilla warfare, counter-insurgency, terrorism, and any other situation which involves a breakdown of the normal procedures for handling accused prisoners, civilian or military.

Civilian jurisdiction

In nearly all civilian jurisdictions, summary execution is illegal, as it violates the right of the accused to a fair trial. Almost all constitutions or legal systems based on common law have prohibited execution without the decision and sentence of a competent judge, and the UN's International Covenant on Civil and Political Rights (ICCPR) has declared the same:

In practice, though, extrajudicial killings have been performed by police and domestic forces in various countries and times, sometimes under martial law. It is also performed by armed bands fighting against governments and common citizens.

Military jurisdiction

Under military law, summary execution is illegal in almost all circumstances, as a military tribunal would be the competent judge needed to determine guilt and declare a sentence of death. However, there are certain exceptions to this rule in emergencies and warfare where summary execution is legal.

Prisoners of war

Major treaties such as the Geneva Conventions and Hague Conventions, and customary international law from history, protect the rights of captured regular and irregular enemy soldiers, along with civilians of enemy states. Prisoners-of-war (POWs) must be treated in carefully defined ways which definitively ban summary execution, as the Second Additional Protocol of the Geneva Conventions (1977) states:

Exceptions to prisoners of war status

However, some classes of combatants may not be accorded POW status, but that definition has broadened to cover more classes of combatants over time. In the past, summary execution of pirates, spies, and francs-tireurs have been performed and considered legal under existing international law. Francs-tireurs (a term originating in the Franco-Prussian War) are enemy civilians or militia who continue to fight in territory occupied by a warring party and do not wear military uniforms, and may otherwise be known as guerrillas, partisans, insurgents, etc. Though they could be legally jailed or executed by most armies a century ago, the experience of World War II influenced nations occupied by foreign forces to change the law to protect this group. Many of the post-war victors, such as France, Poland, and the USSR, had the experience of resistance fighters being summarily executed by the Axis if they were captured. The war also influenced them to make sure that commandos and other special forces who were caught deep behind enemy lines would be protected as POWs, rather than summarily executed as Hitler decreed through his 1942 Commando Order.

The Commando Order was issued by Adolf Hitler on October 18, 1942, stating that all Allied commandos encountered by German forces in Europe and Africa should be killed immediately without trial, even in proper uniforms or if they attempted to surrender. Any commando or small group of commandos or a similar unit, agents and saboteurs not in proper uniforms who fell into the hands of the German military forces by some means other than direct combat (through the police in occupied territories, for instance) were to be handed over immediately to the Sicherheitsdienst (SD, Security Service). The order, which was issued in secret, made it clear that failure to carry out such orders by any commander or officer would be considered to be an act of negligence punishable under German military law. This was in fact the second "Commando Order", the first being issued by Generalfeldmarschall Gerd von Rundstedt on July 21, 1942, stipulating that parachutists should be handed over to the Gestapo. Shortly after World War II, at the Nuremberg Trials, the Commando Order was found to be a direct breach of the laws of war, and German officers who carried out illegal executions under the Commando Order were found guilty of war crimes.

According to Article 4 of the Third Geneva Convention of 1949, irregular forces are entitled to prisoner of war status if they are commanded by a person responsible for the subordinates, have a fixed distinctive sign recognizable at a distance, carry arms openly, and conduct their operations in accordance with the laws and customs of war. If they do not meet all of those conditions, they may be considered francs-tireurs (in the original sense of "illegal combatant") and punished as criminals in a military jurisdiction, which may include summary execution.

Soldiers who are wearing uniforms of the opposing army after the start of combat may be considered illegal combatants and subject to summary execution. Many armies have performed that kind of false flag ruse in the past, including both German and US special forces during World War II. However, if soldiers remove their disguises and put on proper insignia before the start of combat in such an operation, they are considered legal combatants and must be treated as prisoners-of-war if captured. That distinction was settled by a military tribunal in the postwar trial of Otto Skorzeny, who led Operation Greif, an infiltration mission in which German commandos wore US uniforms to infiltrate US lines during the Battle of the Bulge.

Under martial law

Within a state's policy, martial law may be declared in emergencies such as invasions or insurrections, and in such a case constitutionally protected rights would be suspended. Depending on a state's interpretation of martial law, this may allow police or military forces to decide and carry out punishments that include death on its own citizens, in order to restore lawful authority or for other vital reasons.

That would not include killing a suspect who is directly endangering another's life, which is always legal for police, but executing a suspect under one's control as a punishment. Proving that a summary execution fell under the legal exception would be exceptionally difficult, as one would have to show why a judgment and sentence of death absolutely needed to be meted out on the spot. Hence, such extraordinary acts are almost always seen as illegal violations of human rights.

See also
 Encounter killings by police
 Extrajudicial punishment
 Extrajudicial killing
 Forced disappearance
 License to kill (concept)
 Lynching
 Retributive justice
 Vigilante

References

War crimes
Human rights abuses
Capital punishment
Extrajudicial killings by type
Law of war
Euphemisms